Macarthur Football Club is an Australian professional association football club based in Oran Park, Sydney. The club was formed in 2017 as Macarthur South West United before being renamed as Macarthur FC in 2019.

The list encompasses the honours won by Macarthur FC, records set by the club, their managers and their players. The player records section itemises the club's leading goalscorers and those who have made most appearances in first-team competitions. It also records notable achievements by Macarthur FC players on the international stage. Attendance records at Campbelltown are also included.

Macarthur FC has won one top-flight title that being the Australia Cup in 2022. The club's record appearance maker is Lachlan Rose who made 64 appearances between 2020 and the present day. Matt Derbyshire is Macarthur FC's record goalscorer, scoring 14 goals in total.

All figures are correct as of 28 January 2023

Honours

Domestic
 Australia Cup
Winners (1): 2022

Player records

Appearances
 Most A-League Men appearances: Lachlan Rose, 57
 Youngest first-team player: Michael Ruhs, 18 years, 155 days (against Central Coast Mariners, A-League, 3 January 2021)
 Oldest first-team player: Adam Federici, 36 years, 140 days (against Melbourne City, A-League, 20 June 2021)
 Most consecutive appearances: Al Hassan Toure, 36 (from 1 February 2022 to 8 January 2023)

Most appearances
Competitive matches only, includes appearances as substitute. Numbers in brackets indicate goals scored.

Goalscorers
 Most goals in a match: Matt Derbyshire, 3 goals (against Adelaide United, A-League, 12 February 2021)
 Youngest goalscorer: Denis Genreau, 18 years, 266 days (against Melbourne City, A-League, 24 February 2021)
 Oldest goalscorer: Mark Milligan, 35 years, 300 days (against Western United, A-League, 31 May 2021)

Top goalscorers
Matt Derbyshire is the all-time top goalscorer for Macarthur FC. He broke the record after five other players had scored one goal on 9 February 2021.

Competitive matches only. Numbers in brackets indicate appearances made.

International

This section refers to caps won while a Macarthur FC player.

 First capped player: Denis Genreau, for Australia against Chinese Taipei on 7 June 2021.
 Most capped player: Denis Genreau with 1 cap.

Managerial records

 First full-time manager: Ante Milicic managed Macarthur FC 15 from May 2022 to 8 May 2022
 Longest-serving manager: Ante Milicic – 2 years, 358 days (15 May 2019 to 8 May 2022)
 Highest win percentage: Dwight Yorke, 55.56%
 Lowest win percentage: Mile Sterjovski, 0.00%

Club records

Matches

Firsts
 First match: Macarthur South West United 0–4 Central Coast Mariners, friendly, 12 October 2018
 First A-League Men match: Western Sydney Wanderers 0–1 Macarthur FC, 30 December 2020
 First Australia Cup match: Newcastle Olympic 0–3 Macarthur FC, 13 November 2021
 First competitive match at Campbelltown Stadium: Macarthur FC 0–2 Central Coast Mariners, A-League Men, 3 January 2021

Record wins
 Record A-League Men win: 4–0 against Adelaide United, 12 February 2021
 Record Australia Cup win: 6–0 against Magpies Crusaders United, 30 July 2022

Record defeats
 Record A-League Men defeat: 0–4 against Western Sydney Wanderers, 1 January 2023
 Record Australia Cup defeat: 0–2 against Sydney FC, 8 December 2021

Record consecutive results
 Record consecutive wins: 5, from 30 July 2022 to 1 October 2022
 Record consecutive matches without a win: 5
 from 9 April 2021 – 1 May 2021
 from 26 December 2021 – 13 February 2022
 Record consecutive matches without a defeat: 9, from 8 May 2022 to 21 October 2022
 Record consecutive defeats: 3, from 19 April 2022 to 1 May 2022
 Record consecutive matches without conceding a goal: 3
 from 30 July 2022 to 31 August 2022
 from 1 October 2022 to 16 October 2022
 Record consecutive matches without scoring a goal: 2, from 8 March 2021 to 12 March 2021

Goals
 Most A-League Men goals scored in a season: 38 in 26 matches, 2021–22
 Fewest A-League Men goals scored in a season: 33 in 26 matches, 2020–21
 Most A-League Men goals conceded in a season: 47 in 26 matches, 2021–22
 Fewest A-League Men goals conceded in a season: 36 in 26 matches, 2020–21

Goals
 Most points in a season: 39 in 26 matches, A-League, 2020–21
 Fewest points in a season: 33 in 26 matches, A-League Men, 2021–22

Attendances
 Highest attendance in Campbelltown: 7,021, against Sydney FC, A-League Men, 29 October 2022
 Lowest attendance in Campbelltown: 1,521, against Wellington Phoenix, Australia Cup, 31 August 2022

References

Australian soccer club statistics
Macarthur FC